Carry Nation is an opera in a prologue and two acts by composer Douglas Moore which is based on the life of temperance activist Carrie Nation, whose sometimes spelled her first name "Carry". The work uses an English-language libretto by W. N. Jayme. The opera was commissioned by the University of Kansas in commemoration of the school's 100th anniversary. The premiere performance was given at KU's Murphy Hall on March 28, 1966  with a cast headlined by four professional opera singers brought in for the event, and the supporting cast supplied by KU's music and theatre students. Lewin Goff staged the production and Robert Baustian conducted. The opera was subsequently given its first professional production at the San Francisco Opera in June 1966 under the baton of Herbert Grossman. The New York City Opera mounted the first New York production in March 1968 and released a recording of the work in 1969. All three of these initial stagings and the recording starred mezzo-soprano Beverly Wolff in the title role.

References

Operas
Operas set in the United States
English-language operas
1966 operas
Operas set in the 19th century
Operas set in the 20th century
Operas based on real people
Cultural depictions of American women
Operas by Douglas Moore
University of Kansas
Opera